Richard Bartlett Schroder (born April 13, 1970) is an American actor and filmmaker. As a child actor billed as Ricky Schroder he debuted in the film The Champ (1979), for which he became the youngest Golden Globe award recipient, and went on to become a child star on the sitcom Silver Spoons. He has continued acting as an adult, usually billed as Rick Schroder, notably as "Newt" on the Western miniseries Lonesome Dove (1989) and in the crime-drama series NYPD Blue. He made his directorial debut with the film Black Cloud (2004) and has produced several films and television series including the anthology film Locker 13 and the war documentary The Fighting Season.

Early life
Schroder was born in Brooklyn, New York City and raised on Staten Island, the son of Diane Katherine Bartlett and Richard John Schroder, both former employees of AT&T. His paternal grandparents were German immigrants. Schroder's mother quit her job to raise him and his sister Dawn. As a child, Schroder appeared in many catalogs, and by age six, he had appeared in 60 advertisements.

Career

As a child actor 
Schroder made his film debut as the son of Jon Voight's character in The Champ, a 1979 remake of the 1931 film of the same title. He was nominated for, and subsequently won, a Golden Globe award in 1980 for Best New Male Star of the Year in a Motion Picture, becoming at age nine the youngest Golden Globe winner in history. Following his role in The Champ, Schroder was removed from school by his parents in the third grade to focus on his career. He moved to Los Angeles with his mother, but his father remained in New York City and kept his job with AT&T. The following year, Schroder appeared in the Disney feature film The Last Flight of Noah's Ark with Elliott Gould. He also starred as the title character in Little Lord Fauntleroy, alongside Alec Guinness.

Schroder then became well known as the star of the television series Silver Spoons. He played a starring role as Ricky Stratton, the son of a wealthy and eccentric millionaire, Edward Stratton. His performance earned him two Young Artist Awards. He struggled with his identity as an actor when Silver Spoons ended. Prospective roles were rare, and he was mainly designated to play boyish-looking teenagers or blond-haired heartthrobs. Schroder avoided the vices of other child actors and attempted to establish himself as a more mature actor, dropping the "y" from his first name. His mother enrolled him in Calabasas High School, but Schroder had trouble adjusting to the new environment.

In 1988, a year after Silver Spoons ended, Schroder starred in a prime time CBS TV movie based on a true story, the drama Too Young the Hero, as 12-year-old Calvin Graham who passes for 17 to enlist in World War II. He also appeared as the guest timekeeper in Wrestlemania 2 for a match between Hulk Hogan and King Kong Bundy.

Later career
After graduating from high school, Schroder enrolled in Mesa State College in Grand Junction, Colorado. His co-starring role in the Western miniseries Lonesome Dove and its sequel, Return to Lonesome Dove, helped him to be recognized in more mature roles. His roles as Danny Sorenson on three seasons of NYPD Blue, nurse Paul Flowers in Scrubs, Dr. Dylan West on Strong Medicine, and Mike Doyle on the 2007 season of 24 worked to cement that perception with the viewing audience. In the fall of 2002 he hosted The New American Sportsman on ESPN2, a remake of the 1965–1986 outdoor TV series The American Sportsman.

Schroder made his directorial debut in 2004 with the feature film Black Cloud, a drama also written by him about a Navajo boxer. Black Cloud received positive receptions at film festivals, including two awards at the Phoenix Film Festival and Best Director award for Schroder at the San Diego Film Festival. He also directed and starred in the music video for "Whiskey Lullaby", a song by Brad Paisley and Alison Krauss. The video garnered Schroder an award for Best Music Video at the 2005 Nashville Film Festival, while at the 2005 CMT Music Awards, the video won an award for Collaborative Video of the Year, and Schroder won for Director of the Year.

In 2009, he directed the adventure horror film Hellhounds. He guest-starred in a January 2011 episode of ABC's No Ordinary Family.

With his production company, Ricky Schroder Productions, he produced Starting Strong, a series of recruiting commercials for the U.S. Army shot as reality series in 2013. His production company has well as other documentaries The Fighting Season, My Fighting Season, and The Volunteers. Schroder spent 110 days in Afghanistan with the US military in 2014 to capture footage. In 2013 he directed, produced, and starred in the TV film Our Wild Hearts for the Hallmark Channel, and the following year co-produced and starred in the anthology film Locker 13. He portrayed the father of Dolly Parton in the 2015 TV film Dolly Parton's Coat of Many Colors and its sequel, Dolly Parton's Christmas of Many Colors: Circle of Love.

Personal life
Schroder married Andrea Bernard on September 26, 1992. They have four children: Holden, Luke, Cambrie, and Faith. They all appeared in Schroder's Our Wild Hearts (2013). In 2000, Schroder joined his wife's church, The Church of Jesus Christ of Latter-day Saints. He is not very vocal about his religious beliefs, and said in a 2015 interview: "I don't consider myself an extremely religious person, but at the same time I do believe there is higher power." He and his wife separated in 2016, and she filed for divorce later in the year.

He is an avid hunter and fisherman, having learned to shoot at the age of 10 from actor William Holden on the set of The Earthling. For 16 years he owned a 15,000-acre ranch near Grand Junction, Colorado, adjacent to Grand Mesa National Forest.

A 2004 news article called Schroder "one of the few out-of-the-closet conservatives" in the entertainment industry. Schroder has long identified as a Republican, and he spoke at the 2000 Republican National Convention, although he said in 2010 that he did not align with either major political party.

In 2019, Schroder was arrested twice within a month for suspicion of domestic violence; no charges were filed. In November 2020, Schroder contributed hundreds of thousands of dollars towards the $2million bail fund for Kyle Rittenhouse, a 17-year old found not guilty in the shooting deaths of two people during the August 2020 unrest in Kenosha, Wisconsin.

In May 2021, Schroder created controversy when he uploaded a video to social media that showed him harassing a Costco employee regarding the company's policy and California mandate requiring face masks or coverings to be worn inside stores during the COVID-19 pandemic. Shortly after the incident, Schroder began receiving backlash, causing him to upload a second video apologizing to the employee, stating that while he stood by his beliefs on the mask mandate, he was sorry if he hurt the employee's feelings.

Filmography

Film

Television

Director
2004: Black Cloud 
2009: Hellhounds
2013: Our Wild Hearts

Awards and nominations

References

Bibliography
 Holmstrom, John (1996). The Moving Picture Boy: An International Encyclopaedia from 1895 to 1995. Norwich: Michael Russell. pp. 379–380.

External links

 
 Rick Schroder's Television Schedule

1970 births
20th-century American male actors
21st-century American male actors
American male child actors
American male film actors
American male television actors
American people of German descent
American people of Norwegian descent
American people of Scandinavian descent
Converts to Mormonism
Film directors from California
Film directors from New York City
Living people
Male actors from New York City
New Star of the Year (Actor) Golden Globe winners
People from Brooklyn
People from Staten Island
People from Topanga, California